Memfis Film AB also known as Memfis Filmproduktion AB and AB Memfis Film & Television, is a Swedish film production company. Founded by Lars Jönsson in 1989, Memfis is one of few comparatively new production units that has shown staying power and played a continuous role in the Swedish film community. Memfis have produced film by Lukas Moodysson, Josef Fares, and Lars von Trier among others.

Selected productions

References

External links
Memfis Film at the Swedish Film Database

Film production companies of Sweden
Mass media companies established in 1989
Companies based in Stockholm